Matala may refer to:
 Matala, Crete
 Matala, Angola
 Matala, Finland